The 2018 Premier Development League season was the 24th season of the PDL, and the last under the PDL name. The regular season started on May 4 and ended on July 16. Calgary Foothills FC won the final championship under the PDL branding, having defeated Reading United AC 4–2 in extra time in the Championship game on August 4, 2018.

Changes from 2017

New teams

A total of 12 new member clubs join the PDL for the 2018 season.

Name changes

Palm Beach Suns FC became Next Academy Palm Beach
Fresno Fuego became Fresno FC U-23
South Florida Surf became North County United

Folded

 Burlingame Dragons FC
 BYU Cougars
 FC Boulder U23
 Jersey Express S.C.
 K-W United FC
 Nashville SC U23
 Saint Louis FC U23
 SoCal Surf
 Tampa Bay Rowdies U-23
 Wilmington Hammerheads

Standings

Eastern Conference

Mid Atlantic Division

Northeast Division

South Atlantic Division

Western Conference

Northwest Division

Mountain Division

Southwest Division

Central Conference

Great Lakes Division

Heartland Division

Southern Conference

Deep South Division

Mid South Division

Southeast Division

Playoffs
{{16TeamBracket
| RD1 = Conference Semifinals
| RD2 = Conference Finals
| RD3 = National Semifinals
| RD4 = National Championship
| team-width = 175
| subgroup1= Southern Conference
| subgroup2= Eastern Conference
| subgroup3= Western Conference
| subgroup4= Central Conference
| RD1-seed01 = DS
| RD1-team01 = Tormenta FC
| RD1-score01= 0
| RD1-seed02 = WC
| RD1-team02 = The Villages SC
| RD1-score02= 1
| RD1-seed03 = SE
| RD1-team03 = SIMA Aguilas
| RD1-score03= 2
| RD1-seed04 = MS
| RD1-team04 = Brazos Valley Cavalry F.C.
| RD1-score04= 1
| RD1-seed05 = MA
| RD1-team05 = Reading United AC
| RD1-score05= 4
| RD1-seed06 = SA
| RD1-team06 = Myrtle Beach Mutiny
| RD1-score06= 3
| RD1-seed07 = NE
| RD1-team07 = Black Rock FC
| RD1-score07= 1
| RD1-seed08 = WC
| RD1-team08 = New York Red Bulls U-23
| RD1-score08 = 2
| RD1-seed09 = SW
| RD1-team09 = FC Golden State Force
| RD1-score09= 2(1)
| RD1-seed10 = WC
| RD1-team10 = FC Tucson
| RD1-score10= 2(3)
| RD1-seed11 = NW
| RD1-team11 = Calgary Foothills FC
| RD1-score11= 1
| RD1-seed12 = MT
| RD1-team12 = Colorado Rapids U-23
| RD1-score12= 0
| RD1-seed13 = HL1
| RD1-team13 = Des Moines Menace| RD1-score13= 0(4)| RD1-seed14 = GL2
| RD1-team14 = Lansing United
| RD1-score14= 0(3)
| RD1-seed15 = GL1
| RD1-team15 = Dayton Dutch Lions
| RD1-score15= 3
| RD1-seed16 = HL2
| RD1-team16 = Chicago FC United
| RD1-score16= 5
| RD2-seed01 = WC
| RD2-team01 = The Villages SC
| RD2-score01= 2*
| RD2-seed02 = SE
| RD2-team02 = SIMA Aguilas
| RD2-score02= 1
| RD2-seed03 = MA
| RD2-team03 = Reading United AC
| RD2-score03= 2
| RD2-seed04 = WC
| RD2-team04 = New York Red Bulls U-23
| RD2-score04= 1
| RD2-seed05 = WC
| RD2-team05 = FC Tucson
| RD2-score05= 0
| RD2-seed06 = NW
| RD2-team06 = Calgary Foothills FC
| RD2-score06= 2
| RD2-seed07 = HL1
| RD2-team07 = Des Moines Menace
| RD2-score07= 0
| RD2-seed08 = HL2
| RD2-team08 = Chicago FC United| RD2-score08= 1| RD3-seed01 = WC
| RD3-team01 = The Villages SC
| RD3-score01= 0
| RD3-seed02 = MA| RD3-team02 = Reading United AC| RD3-score02= 1*
| RD3-seed03 = NW| RD3-team03 = Calgary Foothills FC| RD3-score03= 1| RD3-seed04 = HL2
| RD3-team04 = Chicago FC United
| RD3-score04= 0
| RD4-seed01 = MA
| RD4-team01 = Reading United AC
| RD4-score01= 2
| RD4-seed02 = NW| RD4-team02 = Calgary Foothills FC| RD4-score02= 4*
}}Bold = winner
* = after extra time, = penalty shootout score

Conference Championships

The PDL Conference Championships were held over the weekend of July 20–21. Matches were played at: Whittier, CA (Western Conference, host FC Golden State Force); Reading, PA (Eastern Conference, host Reading United AC); Des Moines, IA (Central Conference, host Des Moines Menace); and Statesboro, GA (Southern Conference, host South Georgia Tormenta FC). The four conference champions advanced to the PDL semifinals.

Awards
 Most Valuable Player: Ryosuke Kinoshita (DMM)
 Golden Boot: Marek Weber (SCU)
 Young (U21) Player of the Year: Luka Prpa (CHI)
 Coach of the Year: Alan McCann, (REA)
 Goalkeeper of the Year: Marco Carducci (CGY)
 Defender of the Year: Jordan Skelton (MIS)

All-League and All-Conference Teams

Eastern ConferenceF: Ifunanyachi Achara (BLR), Khori Bennett (REA), Charlie Ledula (LIR)M: Jakov Basic (BOS), Ricardo Gomez (MYB), Aaron Molloy (REA) *, Brian Saramago (NYR)D: Prosper Figbe (BLR), Kamal Miller (REA), Kevin O'Toole (NYR)G: Bennet Strutz (REA)

Central ConferenceF: Austin Ricci (MIB), Kinoshita Ryosuke (DMM) *, Tucker Stephenson (KAW)M: Kyle Carr (LNU), Brad Dunwell (MIB), Luka Prpa (CHI) *, Tate Robertson (DAY) *D: Ebenezer Ackon (LNU), Mark Lindstrom (CIN), Grant Stoneman (CHI)G: Carlos Mercado (DMM)

Southern ConferenceF: Brandon Guhl (BVC), Juan Tejada (LAK), Marek Weber (SCU) *M: David Graydon (SIM), Marco Micaletto (SGT) *, Leonardo Paiva (VIL), Toni Soler (SGT)D: Mathieu Laurent (BIR), Jordan Skelton (MIS) *, Gabriel Torres (VIL) *G: Pablo Jara (SGT)

Western ConferenceF: Moses Danto (CGY) *, Santiago Patino (SEA), Samuel Villava (GSF)M: Elijah Adekugbe (CGY), Nico Pasquotti (CGY), Matteo Polisi (TSS), Willy Spurr (LAN)D: Henry Lander (TUC), Callum Montgomery (VIC) *, Dominick Zator (CGY)G:' Marco Carducci (CGY) ** denotes All-League player''

References

USL League Two seasons
2018 in American soccer leagues